Rituraj Mohanty better known by his stage name Rituraj, is an Indian singer. Mohanty is the winner of a singing competition-show India's Raw Star.

Life and career

1988–2011: Early life and career
Rituraj Mohanty was born in Nimapada town of Puri district of Odisha. He is the elder son of Sri Chakradhar Mohanty and Pravati Mohanty. Sri Chakradhar Mohanty is a musician (Tabla) by profession and singer in small-time jatra dunia. The cousin elder brother Sri Sumanta Mohanty was a reputed music director in oriya classical music industry.  He learnt Odissi music at Utkal Sangeet Mahavidyalaya, Bhubaneswar. He left singing after meeting an accident. He then left for Mumbai seeking for a job and met his family during the show.

2011: Early career and the Raw Star 
Mohanty was trying to get a break as a professional singer. In 2014, he sang the song "Sahib" in Bollywood movie Bhoothnath Returns. He won as one of the three contestants of the "India's Raw Star" and won the competition. Before that he also sang a song named Aam Ke Aam Honge on Satyamev Jayate (Season 2), then he also got some break in Bollywood industry., recently he sung a song for upcoming movie The Pushkar Lodge and also acted in the movie as a leading singer of a rock band.

Hindi songs

Odia songs

References

External links 
 

1988 births
Living people
Indian male singers
Indian male television actors
Male actors from Odisha
People from Puri